Nazar is a 2005 Indian Hindi-language thriller film directed by Soni Razdan starring Meera and Ashmit Patel. The film introduces Pakistani actress Meera to Bollywood and it also featured a kissing scene (afterwards cut) which was center of attention for the Pakistani government.

Nazar was released along with Naina, another film based on the similar theme of extra-sensory perception. Although Naina was horror flick and Nazar was a musical thriller.

Plot
Nazar revolves around a young and talented pop star Divya (Meera). From the start it is obvious the existence of a strange aura surrounding Divya's personality. She is a girl who has lived a secluded life after the death of her parents in a car crash.
After shooting her last video she decides she wants to go home. Along the way, despite the darkness she discovers a dead body on the middle of the road.

From this moment on Divya has visions of the future, rather than an art it becomes like a curse for Divya as all she sees is brutal murders. In her visions all she sees is dance-bargirls being stabbed, strangled and suffocated to death by a killer whose face continues to elude Divya's clairvoyance.

Unknowing to her, a policeman, Rohan (Ashmit Patel), is investigating murders of bargirls in the city. A serial killer is on the loose and Rohan has the case to nab him.

Rohan buys Divya's story (about her visions of murders) but his female assistant Sujata (Koel Purie) does not. Taking help of Divya's clairvoyance, he begins to zero down on prime suspects that include a doctor, a fugitive and an eccentric-alcoholic uncle who frequents bars regularly.

As the movie progresses, Divya becomes the next on the murders list of the unknown killer who might have been the same who killed the person on the road that she found that night.

In the end, it turns out that Sujata is the serial killer: her husband slept with a bargirl who passes AIDS to him, who in turn gave the disease to Sujata. From then on, she developed a dislike for the bar girls in the city and goes on a killing spree. She dies at the end by falling off a building.

Cast
 Meera ... Divya Varma (Malavika Shivpuri for dubbing)
 Ashmit Patel ... Inspector Rohan Sethi
 Koel Purie ... Sub-Inspector Sujata Deshmukh
 Rupak Mann
 Alyy Khan ... Dr. Tarun Khanna
 Neena Gupta
 Sarita Joshi

Soundtrack
The Soundtrack was composed by Anu Malik & Roop Kumar Rathod

References

External links
 
 Nazar at Cinémathèque québécoise

2005 films
2000s Hindi-language films
Films scored by Anu Malik
Indian erotic thriller films
2000s erotic thriller films